Under Two Flags is a 1936 American adventure romance film directed by Frank Lloyd and starring Ronald Colman, Claudette Colbert, Victor McLaglen, and Rosalind Russell. The picture was based on the 1867 novel of the same name by the writer Ouida. The film was widely popular with audiences of its time. The supporting cast features Nigel Bruce, John Carradine, and Fritz Leiber.

The novel was previously adapted for the screen in 1912; 1916, starring Theda Bara; and 1922, under the direction by Tod Browning.

Plot
Victor (Ronald Colman) joins the French Foreign Legion, along with his faithful valet, Rake (Herbert Mundin). His company is attacked while escorting a caravan. The survivors join a battalion stationed in southern Algeria.

His new commander is Major Doyle (Victor McLaglen), who becomes jealous when Cigarette (Claudette Colbert), a cafe singer, loses her heart to Victor. However, Victor and a refined visiting Englishwoman, Lady Venetia (Rosalind Russell), fall in love. Cigarette finds out and is heartbroken. Doyle learns about Cigarette's true feelings. Meanwhile, a carving of a horse created by Victor leads to Lady Venetia discovering from her uncle, Lord Seraph, that a certain English officer left England due to a scandal. It turns out that the officer was shielding his younger brother. The brother later met with a fatal accident, but lived long enough to exonerate Victor.

When Arab unrest threatens to erupt into open conflict, Doyle is ordered to prevent it. He sends Victor off on suicidal mission after suicidal mission to try to get rid of his rival, but the sergeant returns each time unscathed. Then Doyle orders him to take 20 men to man an isolated fort, where they are surrounded by a vastly larger Arab force. Cigarette learns what Doyle is doing and rides out into the desert. Doyle repents his actions and leads a relief force, but Victor can only watch helplessly as they march into a trap. They manage to hold out until nightfall ends the fighting temporarily. Victor sneaks in, disguised as an Arab, and reports to Doyle. When Doyle tells him that reinforcements could arrive at noon the next day, Victor volunteers to buy time with a ploy of his own devising.

Victor goes to see Sidi-Ben Youssiff, the Arab leader, who turns out to have been a classmate at Oxford. Victor tells him that there is a British force to the Arabs' rear. Sidi-Ben Youssiff scoffs at the idea that the French would allow British troops in their territory, but Victor persuades him to send scouts to check. They find nothing, but before Sidi-Ben Youssiff can execute Victor, French chasseurs (found by Cigarette during the night and informed of the battalion's plight) attack the Arab camp, routing the Arabs and ending the revolt. During the fighting, Cigarette is shot and dies in Victor's arms.

Afterward, Victor is shown in civilian clothes holding Lady Venetia's hand during a ceremony honoring Cigarette.

Cast
 Ronald Colman as Sergeant Victor
 Claudette Colbert as Cigarette
 Victor McLaglen as Major Doyle
 Rosalind Russell as Lady Venetia Cunningham
 Gregory Ratoff as Ivan
 Nigel Bruce as Captain Menzies
 C. Henry Gordon as Lieutenant Petaine
 Herbert Mundin as Rake
 John Carradine as Cafard
 Lumsden Hare as Lord Seraph
 J. Edward Bromberg as Colonel Ferol
 Onslow Stevens as Sidi-Ben Youssiff
 Fritz Leiber as French Governor
 Thomas Beck as Pierre
 William Ricciardi as Cigarette's Father
 Frank Reicher as French General
 Francis McDonald as Husson
 Harry Semels as Sergeant Malinas
 Nicholas Soussanin as Levine
 Douglas Gerrard as Colonel Farley

Production
The role of 'Cigarette' was originally filmed with Simone Simon, but when Zanuck was not impressed with her footage, he refilmed it with Claudette Colbert.

The film was shot on location in California in Imperial County, Indio, La Quinta and Palm Springs (Palm Canyon), and in Yuma, Arizona.

Reception
Writing for The Spectator in 1936, Graham Greene gave the film a good review, specifically praising the film's climax (when a disguised Victor meets Sidi-Ben-Youssiff) as "superb". Despite some mocking of the British Board of Film Censors over its award of an "Adult Certificate" for what amounted to "six chaste, sandy kisses", Greene approved of the film's acting and specifically lauded the acting of Colbert for whose admiration Greene noted was unbounded.

In The New York Times review, Frank Nugent called Under Two Flags a "spirited and colorful revival" that "continues to be a stirring and romantic fable". His only qualm was that "Miss Colbert, gracious actress though she is, was not particularly fitted for the rôle of Cigarette, lacking somehow the whole-hearted "child of nature" qualities Ouida imagined."

The film was a success at the box office.

References

External links
 
 
 
 

1936 films
1930s English-language films
1936 adventure films
1930s romance films
20th Century Fox films
American adventure films
American black-and-white films
American romantic drama films
Films based on British novels
Films based on works by Ouida
Films directed by Frank Lloyd
Films produced by Darryl F. Zanuck
Films set in Algeria
Films set in deserts
Films shot in Arizona
Films shot in California
Films about the French Foreign Legion
Films scored by Louis Silvers
1930s American films